The 2016 Philippine Basketball Association (PBA) Governors' Cup Finals was the best-of-7 championship series of the 2016 PBA Governors' Cup, and the conclusion of the conference's playoffs. The Barangay Ginebra San Miguel and Meralco Bolts competed for the 16th Governors' Cup championship and the 118th overall championship contested by the league.

Barangay Ginebra San Miguel won the series, four games to two, ending their eight-year title drought. This is the first Governors' Cup and 9th overall championship of the Ginebra franchise.

Background

Road to the finals

Head-to-head matchup

Series summary

*overtime

Game 1

Jimmy Alapag of the Meralco Bolts sank two three-pointers, tying the all-time record for most triples in a career, which stands at 1,242, held by Allan Caidic for 17 years. The second three-pointer proved to be critical for the game as it gave the Bolts a 101–100 lead with 33 seconds remaining. However, a game-tying floater from Ginebra's LA Tenorio brought the game into overtime, with 102 apiece after the Bolts' import Allen Durham split two free throws.

In overtime, Durham started a 7–0 run of himself and Meralco never looked back, winning the very first PBA finals game of their history. He finished with 46 points, 13 boards and 7 assists, and rookie teammate Chris Newsome added 17 markers and was a rebound and assist shy of a triple-double.

Game 2

Prior to the game, TNT KaTropa's Jayson Castro was awarded as the Best Player of the Conference, tying San Miguel Beermen's June Mar Fajardo with four BPC awards for second all-time. Meralco Bolts' import Allen Durham was also given the Bobby Parks Best Import of the Conference award, making him the second consecutive Bolts' reinforcement to be given with that award (Arinze Onuaku won the award during the Commissioner's Cup).

Alapag became the all-time leader for three-pointers made in a career, breaking the tie with Allan Caidic's record of 1,242 triples which he reached during Game 1. He made one three-pointer in the game to finish with 1,243 triples in his career. However, this served as a consolation for the Bolts as they lost a tight game against Ginebra. They failed to make a three-pointer in two attempts to tie the game. Barangay Ginebra then tied the series, splitting the first two games.

Game 3

Game 4

Game 5

Game 6

Meralco came out with an 18–4 run in the first quarter and was leading with 13 points coming  into halftime. Robert Jaworski, the former playing coach of Barangay Ginebra from 1985 to 1998, was watching in the venue to support his former team. He also came to Barangay Ginebra's locker room to give some words of encouragement to the players during halftime.

LA Tenorio came out and scored 21 points in the second half to lead Barangay Ginebra's comeback.

With 5.5 seconds remaining, Barangay Ginebra had the final possession with both teams ties at 88-all. Justin Brownlee received the inbound pass and made a three-point attempt several feet behind the rainbow arc with Allen Durham closely guarding him. He made the basket as the buzzer sounded.

Rosters

{| class="toccolours" style="font-size: 95%; width: 100%;"
|-
! colspan="2" style="background-color: #; color: #; text-align: center;" | Barangay Ginebra San Miguel 2016 PBA Governors' Cup roster
|- style="background-color:#; color: #; text-align: center;"
! Players !! Coaches
|-
| valign="top" |
{| class="sortable" style="background:transparent; margin:0px; width:100%;"
! Pos. !! # !! POB !! Name !! Height !! Weight !! !! College 
|-

 

{| class="toccolours" style="font-size: 95%; width: 100%;"
|-
! colspan="2" style="background-color: #; color: #; text-align: center;" | Meralco Bolts 2016 PBA Governors' Cup roster
|- style="background-color:#; color: #; text-align: center;"
! Players !! Coaches
|-
| valign="top" |
{| class="sortable" style="background:transparent; margin:0px; width:100%;"
! Pos. !! # !! POB !! Name !! Height !! Weight !! !! College 
|-

Broadcast notes
The Governors' Cup Finals was aired on TV5 with a separate live broadcast on PBA Rush (both in standard and high definition). TV5's radio arm, Radyo5 provided the radio play-by-play coverage.

Sports5 also provided online livestreaming via their official YouTube account using the TV5 feed. (Available only in the Philippines)

The PBA Rush broadcast aired the championship series with English-language commentary.

Additional Game 6 crew:
Trophy presentation: James Velasquez
Dugout celebration interviewer: Denise Tan

References

External links
PBA official website

2016
2015–16 PBA season
Barangay Ginebra San Miguel games
Meralco Bolts games
PBA Governors' Cup Finals